WDUX-FM (92.7 MHz) is a radio station broadcasting a classic hits format. Licensed to Waupaca, Wisconsin, United States, the station is currently owned by Tower Road Media. Current on-air personalities include Rick Winters (6am-9am).

History
WDUX began as a stand-alone AM radio station in 1956, at 800 kHz on the AM dial. Its FM side, 92.7 WDUX-FM began broadcasting in January 1967. WDUX used the moniker, "Mid-Wisconsin's Hit Music Station." In the early part of the 1980s, it also featured a locally produced jazz show Sunday nights.

At the beginning, the station ran an automated easy listening format, then simulcasted the AM, but in 1987, the AM side began broadcasting an automated country music format, using the monikers "Real Country AM 800 WDUX", & "DUX 'ducks' Country AM 800", while the FM side continued its contemporary music format.

Until May 12, 2020, "FM 92.7" used live & local personalities, opposed to syndicated satellite programming, using Voice Tracking some evening and weekend hours, The FM also carries local sports broadcasts, along with Green Bay Packer Football, Milwaukee Brewer Baseball, Milwaukee Bucks Basketball, and Badger Football and Basketball.  Both stations carried ABC Radio newscasts & features. WDUX became an affiliate of the Milwaukee Brewers Radio Network in 1989, after New London radio station WNBK changed its call letters to WOZZ and moved its studios to Appleton, Wisconsin.

Tower Road Media took over ownership of WDUX(AM) and WDUX-FM effective 5pm on Tuesday, May 12, 2020. All station staff was terminated at the end of Laird Broadcasting's ownership, with Tower Road Media hiring back one full-time staff member, morning show host Rick Winters, and several part-timers. Rick hosts the morning show from 6am-9am and Brad Williams records local news broadcasts for WDUX. The station uses a Classic Hits format.

Current personalities
Rick Winters, Brad Williams

References

External links

DUX-FM
Classic hits radio stations in the United States